WLYY (1400 AM) was a radio station licensed to Copperhill, Tennessee, United States. The station was owned by Joy Christian Communications, Inc.

The station signed on December 2, 1958 as WLSB. It changed its call letters to WLYY on June 23, 2013. On March 6, 2017, Joy Christian Communications requested the cancellation of the station's license, saying that WLYY "is no longer a viable operation" following the loss of its tower site; the license was cancelled on April 26, 2017.

References

External links
FCC Station Search Details: DWLYY (Facility ID: 13862)
FCC History Cards for WLYY (covering 1957-1979 as WLSB)
 

LYY
Polk County, Tennessee
Radio stations established in 1958
1958 establishments in Tennessee
Radio stations disestablished in 2017
2017 disestablishments in Tennessee
Defunct radio stations in the United States
LYY